Cheikh Ahmed Seck (born 8 January 1958) is a Senegalese football goalkeeper who played for Senegal.

References

External links
 

1958 births
Senegalese footballers
Senegal international footballers
Association football goalkeepers
Living people
1986 African Cup of Nations players
1990 African Cup of Nations players
1992 African Cup of Nations players
1994 African Cup of Nations players